Hackelia micrantha is a species of flowering plant in the borage family known by the common names Jessica sticktight and Jessica's stickseed.

Distribution and habitat
It is native to western North America from British Columbia and Alberta, southeast through Montana into Colorado and Utah, and south to the Sierra Nevada in California and Nevada.

It is native to meadows, shrubby slopes, open forests, and streambank habitats.

Description

The upper stems are generally leafless and hold cyme inflorescences of bright blue flowers. Each petite flower has five rounded lobes with a smaller petallike appendage at the base of each. The bloom period is June to August.

The fruit is a nutlet with pointed prickles.

References

External links
Hackelia micrantha (Jessica sticktight,  Jessica's stickseed, small flowered stickseed)
Jepson Manual eFlora (TJM2) treatment of Hackelia micrantha
UC CalPhotos gallery

micrantha
Flora of the Northwestern United States
Flora of Alberta
Flora of British Columbia
Flora of California
Flora of Nevada
Flora of Utah
Flora of the Rocky Mountains
Flora of the Sierra Nevada (United States)
Flora without expected TNC conservation status